Jason Myers (born May 12, 1991) is an American football placekicker for the Seattle Seahawks of the National Football League (NFL). He played college football at Marist.

Professional career

Arena Football League
In the 2014 season, Myers spent time on the San Jose SaberCats. He was signed by the Arizona Rattlers during the 2015 off-season.

Jacksonville Jaguars
On March 3, 2015, Myers signed with the Jacksonville Jaguars.

On August 31, 2015, the Jaguars announced that Myers had earned the placekicker role on the team, after Josh Scobee was traded to the Pittsburgh Steelers.

In the 2016 season, Myers led the league with the most field goal attempts above 50 yards with 12, and most made with seven.

On October 17, 2017, Myers was released by the Jaguars after missing three long field goals including two 54-yard attempts in Week 6 against the Los Angeles Rams.

Seattle Seahawks
On January 3, 2018, Myers signed a contract with the Seattle Seahawks. On August 20, 2018, he was released by the Seahawks after losing the starting kicking job to veteran Sebastian Janikowski.

New York Jets
On August 21, 2018, Myers was claimed off waivers by the New York Jets. He became the Jets' starting kicker after Taylor Bertolet was waived after the preseason. On October 14, 2018, Myers broke the Jets' franchise record for field goals with seven against the Indianapolis Colts as the Jets won 42–34. His performance that game earned Myers the AFC Special Teams Player of the Week. Myers was named to the AFC Pro Bowl roster for his performance during the 2018 season.

Seattle Seahawks (second stint)
On March 14, 2019, Myers signed a four-year, $15.45 million contract with the Seattle Seahawks.

On November 3, 2019, Myers missed two field goals against the Tampa Bay Buccaneers, including a potential game-winning kick at the end of regulation. Nevertheless, the Seahawks would go on to win in overtime, 40–34. The next week, on November 11, 2019, in a Monday Night Football matchup, Myers connected on both of his field goal attempts, including the game-winning 42-yard kick in overtime with no time left on the clock, to lift the Seahawks over the San Francisco 49ers 27–24 and move their record to 8–2 on the season. In the 2019 season, Myers converted 40 of 44 extra point attempts and 23 of 28 field goal attempts.

On November 15, 2020, in a week 10 game against the Los Angeles Rams, Myers hit a career long and Seahawks franchise record long 61 yard field goal as time expired in the first half. On December 20, 2020, in a week 15 game against the Washington Football Team, Myers kicked his 31st consecutive successful field goal, breaking the previous Seahawks record, held by Olindo Mare. He would finish the season a perfect 24 of 24 on field goal attempts, and 49 for 53 extra point attempts.

Myers' consecutive field goal streak would reach 37 straight field goals, the 4th longest streak in NFL history. On September 26, 2021, against the Minnesota Vikings, the streak ended as a 44 yard field goal attempt missed wide left. After missing 4 of his first ten field goals in the season, Myers would end the season by making 11 of his last 13 attempts. In total, Myers made 17 of his 23 field goal attempts and 44 of his 47 extra point attempts during the 2021 season.

In Week 18 Myers missed the game-winning field goal in the 4th quarter but later hit the game-winning field goal in overtime as the Seahawks win 19–16 against the Los Angeles Rams.

On January 18, 2023, Myers signed a four-year contract extension with the Seahawks.

References

External links
Marist Red Foxes bio
Seattle Seahawks bio
Jacksonville Jaguars bio

1991 births
Living people
Sportspeople from Chula Vista, California
Players of American football from California
American football placekickers
Marist Red Foxes football players
Jacksonville Jaguars players
Seattle Seahawks players
New York Jets players
American Conference Pro Bowl players
National Conference Pro Bowl players